Yusuf Tibazi (born March 13, 1996) is an American born Moroccan swimmer. He competed at the 2019 World Aquatics Championships. In 2016 Tibazi compete on the 2016 U.S. Olympic Trials, but didn't qualify the 2016 Summer Olympics. In 2018 Tibazi gave Moroccan nationality, and represent his country in 2018 African Swimming Championships where he won 2 medals.

Major Results

Individual

Long course

Relay

Long course

References

External links
 UC Santa Barbara Gauchos bio

1996 births
Living people
Moroccan male swimmers
Swimmers at the 2019 African Games
African Games bronze medalists for Morocco
African Games medalists in swimming
UC Santa Barbara Gauchos men's swimmers
American male swimmers
Swimmers from Los Angeles